James Kilkenny (21 November 1934 – 1 April 2003) was a footballer who played as a right half for Doncaster Rovers.

He started off playing for his local club Annfield Plain in the North Eastern League. As a 17-year-old, in 1952 he was signed by English second division club Doncaster Rovers, his debut being in a 3–2 home victory against Bristol City on 26 November 1955.

In a match against Liverpool in January 1957, he left Billy Liddell, the Liverpool captain, unconscious and having to leave the field needing three stitches in the head after an aerial duel.

His only league goal came in a 4–0 home victory over Port Vale on 20 April 1957, though he also scored an FA Cup goal in a 2–1 second round win at Tranmere Rovers on 6 December 1958. A serious bout of 'flu in December 1957 left him unfit to play until the following April.

Altogether, Kilkenny played 147 league and cup games for Doncaster, scoring two goals. At the end of the 1960–61 season he left to play for Northern Counties League side South Shields.

References

1934 births
2003 deaths
People from Stanley, County Durham
Footballers from County Durham
English footballers
Association football wing halves
Annfield Plain F.C. players
Doncaster Rovers F.C. players
South Shields F.C. (1936) players
English Football League players